Mykola Fedorovych Fominykh (Николай Фёдорович Фоминых, 1927–1996) was a Soviet football coach and football administrator. He is a Merited Coach of the USSR.

From 1975 to 1989 he was a chief of the Football Department of the Sports Committee of Ukrainian SSR. In interview to Ukrayinskyi Futbol newspaper answering questions about rumors that Fominykh knew nothing about football, the former secretary of Football Federation of the Ukrainian SSR Klavdia Kirianova said that it is not true, but he did indeed know more about ice hockey and even won the Soviet hockey competitions with Dynamo Kyiv junior team. Kirianova admitted that Fominykh was not as good specialist as Oleg Oshenkov, but in her opinion he still was a good leader and well oriented in the field of football administration.

References

External links
 Short mentioning of Fominykh at yandex dictionary
 Sport Necropolis
 Mykola Fominykh. Yandex dictionary.
 Mykola Fominykh. allfutbolist.ru.
 

1927 births
1996 deaths
Sportspeople from Kyiv
Association football executives
Soviet football managers
Ukrainian football managers
FC CSKA Kyiv managers
FC Kryvbas Kryvyi Rih managers
Merited Coaches of the Soviet Union
Football Federation of Ukraine chairmen